Redwing, Saskatchewan, Canada, is a small community in the rural municipality (RM) of Buckland No. 491, located on Saskatchewan Highway 2. Redwing and Red Wing Terrace are both localities of Buckland No. 491.  Red Wing Terrace is north of the locality of Green Acres on Green Acres Road and south of both Red Wing Terrace Road, and White Star.  White Star is located on White Star Road, which is concurrent with Township Road 502 and Saskatchewan Highway 780.

Red Wing Road runs concurrent with Township Road 494, which intersects Saskatchewan Highway 2. For a short time Nesbit Forest post office, located at the legal land description of North West 1/4 Section 8, Township 49, Range 26, West of the 2nd meridian, was the nearest postal location to Red Wing. Prince Albert is located quite near Township 48, Range 26, West of the 2nd meridian.

Education

Historical education

In 1912, the one-room school house, named RED WING School District #2857, was formed at South East Section 32 Township 49 range 26 West of the 2 Meridian, according to the Provincial Archives of Saskatchewan Regina Branch. This location is just to the northwest of the city of Prince Albert.  According to the book, Buckland's Heritage, Margaret Willis was the first teacher.

Current education

Redwing has an elementary school which is a part of the Saskatchewan Rivers School Division.  Red Wing Roman Catholic Separate School Division No. 136 of Saskatchewan was established May 6, 1999.

Economy

A light industrial park has been developed at Redwing via PAREDA, the Prince Albert Regional Economic Development Authority.

It is spelled either Wahpaton, or Wahpeton for the Dakota Sioux Indian reserves. Red Wing was the traditional name for chiefs of the Wahpetonm as they wore a swan's feather dyed red as a sign of their leadership position.

Notes

External links
Our Roots Nos Racines Buckland's Heritage Buckland History Book Committee
Saskatchewan Gen Web - One Room School Project
Post Offices and Postmasters - ArchiviaNet - Library and Archives Canada
Saskatchewan, Canada, Rand McNally 1924 Indexed Pocket Map Tourists' and Shippers' Guide
 Prince Albert Gen Web Region
Redwing, Saskatchewan on Google Maps

Buckland No. 491, Saskatchewan
Unincorporated communities in Saskatchewan
Division No. 15, Saskatchewan